Nothing Serious is a 2021 South Korean romantic film, written and directed by Jeong Ga-young for CJ ENM. Starring Jeon Jong-seo, Son Seok-gu and Gong Min-jung, the film revolves around 32 years old Woo-ri (Son Seok-gu) and 28 years old Ja-young (Jeon Jong-seo), who hate being alone but have anxieties when it comes to dating. They meet with each other through a dating app.

It was theatrically released on November 24, 2021. On box office  it is at 9th place among all the Korean films released in 2021 with 604,672 admission and US$5.15 million gross.

Synopsis
The film is about relationships in the digital age, fuses elements of traditional rom-coms with modern-day technology. The story follows two people of opposite sex who hate dating but feel lonely. It depicts their meeting with each other through a dating app.

Cast
 Jeon Jong-seo as Ham Ja-young
 Son Suk-ku as Park Woo-ri
 Gong Min-jeung as Seon-bin
 Kim Seul-gi as Seon-bin's friend
 Kim Young-ok as Ja-young's grandmother
 Kim Jae-hwa as editor-in-chief of a magazine
 Bae Yoo-ram as Ja-young's best friend
 Im Sung-jae

Special appearance
 Kim Kwang-gyu as Ja-young's father

Production
In September 2020 Jeon Jong-seo and Son Seok-gu were confirmed to play lead roles in the romance film to be written and directed by Jeong Ga-young.

Release
The film was released theatrically on November 24, 2021.

On November 2, 2021, the director Jeong Ga-young released a parody video of a trailer on the global video platform TikTok. It became popular for its witty makeup and facial expressions. This unique way of promotion of the film attracted the Generation Z.

In July 2022, it was invited at the 21st New York Asian Film Festival, where it was screened at Lila Acheson Wallace Auditorium, Asia Society on July 31 for its New York premiere.

Home media
The film was made available for streaming on IPTV (Olleh TV, B TV, LG U+ TV), TVING, Naver TV, GOM Player, Google Play, One Store, and KakaoPage from December 17, 2021.

Original soundtrack 

Songs not featured on the official soundtrack:

 To My Boyfriend (내 남자친구에게) by Fin.K.L
 Some (썸) by Soyou and Junggigo featuring Lil Boi

Reception

Box office
The film was released on 965 screens on November 24, 2021. As per Korean Film Council (Kofic) integrated computer network, the film ranks third on the Korean box office with 209,065 admissions on opening weekend. In its reverse run the film topped the Korean box office in its 3rd week of release garnering 529,469 admissions by 3rd weekend.

 it is at 9th place among all the Korean films released in the year 2021, with gross of US$5.15 million and 604,672 admissions.

Critical response
Heo Min-nyeong of Newsen wrote that in the film "there is no room for boredom," in spite of the main leads hogging 80% of screen time. Heo stated that some sequences made him feel like "I'm watching the heyday of 'Sex and the City'." Kim Nara writing for My Daily praised the chemistry between lead pair Jeon Jong-seo and Son Suk-ku. She stated that the film gave satisfaction for performance as the actors have "acting ability and bouncing energy, which is enough to breathe life into the character and admire it." Kim appreciated the flow of narrative, as she said, "with the honesty and quirkyness of peeling off a single layer of wrapping paper without repeating the common romantic comedy, it 'hook' deeply to the emotional line beyond the hot stimulus."
Kang Hyo-jin reviewing for Sports TV News wrote, "The film's strengths are its blatant honesty and provocative and witty lines." Praising the casting Kang stated, "The free-spirited and unstoppable images of Jeon Jong-seo and Son Seok-gu fit perfectly with the film's precarious love story". Concluding her review she opined, "It is the birth of a masterpiece of romance that combines character, humor, and trend reflection in a short time. Romance Without Love will be a work that is going to be talked about for a long time as a reference for a romance that empathizes with reality.

Accolades

Notes

References

External links
 
 
 
 

2021 films
CJ Entertainment films
2020s Korean-language films
Films postponed due to the COVID-19 pandemic
South Korean romantic comedy films
Films about journalists
Films about online dating
Films about social media
2021 romance films